Edison is a lunar impact crater on the far side of the Moon. It is located just behind the north-northeastern limb of the Moon, a region that is sometimes brought into sight from Earth during favorable librations. However even at such times not much detail can be discerned, and the crater is better observed by orbiting spacecraft.

The Edison crater is attached to the southeastern outer rim of the crater Lomonosov, to the east of the walled plain Joliot. The satellite crater Edison T is attached to the western rim of Edison and the eastern rim of Joliot. To the south of Edison is the crater Dziewulski, and due east is Artamonov.

The outer rim of this crater is somewhat eroded, with two small craters along the southern edge, and the outer rampart of Lomonosov intruding slightly into the interior floor. The most intact section of rim is along the eastern side. The interior floor is relatively level, particularly in the southern half, and there is a small craterlet near the western inner wall. The floor displays dark patches and streaks of higher albedo surface where the ray system from Giordano Bruno to the north-northwest. However it is not as dark in hue as the floor of Lomonosov.

Satellite craters
By convention these features are identified on lunar maps by placing the letter on the side of the crater midpoint that is closest to Edison.

References

 
 
 
 
 
 
 
 
 
 
 
 

Impact craters on the Moon